Haddah is a sub-district located in al-Nadirah District, Ibb Governorate, Yemen. Haddah had a population of 4352 as of 2004.

References 

Sub-districts in An Nadirah District